Siefersheim is an Ortsgemeinde – a municipality belonging to a Verbandsgemeinde, a kind of collective municipality – in the Alzey-Worms district in Rhineland-Palatinate, Germany.

Geography

Location 
The municipality lies at Rhenish Hesse’s western edge and belongs to the Verbandsgemeinde of Wöllstein, whose seat is in the like-named municipality.

Neighbouring municipalities 
Siefersheim’s neighbours are Wonsheim, Wöllstein, Eckelsheim, Gumbsheim and Neu-Bamberg.

Politics

Municipal council 
The council is made up of 16 council members, who were elected by majority vote at the municipal election held on 7 June 2009, and the honorary mayor as chairman.

Mayor 
The current mayor is Annerose Kinder.

Coat of arms 
The municipality’s arms might be described thus: Per pale argent a tower gules, in base a bunch of grapes vert, and sable a lion rampant Or armed, langued and crowned gules.

Economy and infrastructure 
Siefersheim is characterized by Rhenish-Hessian winegrowing and can boast of having a VDP winery in the Weingut Wagner-Stempel, as well as of having a DLG-recommended winery in the Weingut "Alte Schmiede".

Education 
Grundschule Siefersheim (primary school)

References

External links 

 
Siefersheim in the collective municipality’s Web pages 

Alzey-Worms